Hairy Maclary from Donaldson's Dairy first published in 1983, is the first and most well-known of a series of books by New Zealand author Lynley Dodd featuring Hairy Maclary. His adventures are usually in the company of his other animal friends who include the dachshund Schnitzel von Krumm. His arch-enemy is the tomcat Scarface Claw.

Written for pre-school children, it has become a classic bedtime storybook in New Zealand and Australia, and Lynley Dodd's books, including this one, dominate the children's section of the Premier New Zealand Bestsellers list.

The order of introduction of the dogs (with their house number in brackets) is:

 Hairy Maclary (from Donaldson's Dairy), a small dog of mixed pedigree, however bearing a similar resemblance to a Scottish Terrier, (60)
 Hercules Morse (as big as a horse), a Mastiff, (54)
 Bottomley Potts (covered in spots), a Dalmatian, (52)
 Muffin McLay (like a bundle of hay), an Old English Sheepdog, (48)
 Bitzer Maloney (all skinny and bony), a mixed pedigree dog that is part Greyhound, (36) 
 Schnitzel Von Krumm (with a very low tum), a Dachshund, (22)

The story follows the assembly of a pack dogs going to the park, and ends when they're all scared off by a fearsome cat - Scarface Claw.

Like most of Dodd's books, it is written in anapaestic verse, though it breaks into a more urgent trochaic form when the dogs encounter the cat.

It has sold more than 11 million copies worldwide and been translated into Mandarin, Korean, Japanese, Swedish, Russian, Slovene - and te reo Māori. It has also been adapted into a stage play, which has been put on at the Edinburgh Fringe Festival and the Sydney Opera House.

In the 2019 TVNZ series Goodnight Kiwi the prime minister Jacinda Ardern read Hairy Maclary from Donaldson's Dairy the episode aired on TVNZ 2 on Christmas Day.

References

External links

Hairy Maclary from Donaldson's Dairy Puffin Books Australia

1983 children's books
American picture books
Dogs in literature
Books by Lynley Dodd
New Zealand children's books
Fictional dogs
Fictional cats
Books about dogs
Books about cats
Hairy Maclary